Blancanus is a lunar impact crater located in the rugged southern region of the Moon, to the southwest of the walled plain Clavius. To the northwest lies the comparably sized crater Scheiner, and south-southwest of Blancanus is the worn Klaproth.

The outer rim of Blancanus is considerably less worn than that of Scheiner crater to the northwest, and the edge is still fairly well defined and it has a terraced structure on the interior. The floor is relatively flat with several low rises at the midpoint. There is a cluster of small craterlets in the southern part of the crater floor.

Crater Blancanus is named after the Jesuit astronomer and natural philosopher, Giuseppe Biancani (1566–1624).

Satellite craters
By convention these features are identified on lunar maps by placing the letter on the side of the crater midpoint that is closest to Blancanus.

References

 
 
 
 
 
 
 
 
 
 
 
 

Impact craters on the Moon